Julián Francisco Velázquez y Llorente (born 14 May 1944) is a Mexican politician from the National Action Party. From 2009 to 2012 he served as Deputy of the LXI Legislature of the Mexican Congress representing Tlaxcala.

References

1944 births
Living people
Politicians from Mexico City
National Action Party (Mexico) politicians
21st-century Mexican politicians
Mexican paediatricians
Academic staff of the Autonomous University of Tlaxcala
Academic staff of the National Autonomous University of Mexico
Deputies of the LXI Legislature of Mexico
Members of the Chamber of Deputies (Mexico) for Tlaxcala